The Birdville Independent School District is a K-12 public school district based in Haltom City, Texas (USA). The name derives from a former community in the area, which later became part of Haltom City.

Finances
As of the 2017-2018 school year, the appraised valuation of property in the district was $8,233,801,000. The maintenance tax rate was $0.104 and the bond tax rate was $0.041 per $100 of appraised valuation.

Academic achievements
Historical district TEA accountability ratings
Met Standard: 2013-2017
Recognized: 1999-2002
Academically Acceptable: 2004-2011, 1996-1998
Accredited: 1995

Note: Texas state accountability ratings were not assigned in 2003 or 2012

Demographics 
It also serves small parts of Colleyville, Fort Worth, and Hurst. About 120,000 people live in the district.

Schools 
In the 2017-2018 school year, the district had 23,691 students in 33 schools; 21 Elementary Schools, 7 Middle Schools, and 5 High Schools

High schools (Grades 9-12) 
Birdville High School
Haltom High School
Richland High School

Middle schools (Grades 6-8) 
Haltom Middle School
North Oaks Middle School
North Richland Middle School
North Ridge Middle School
Richland Middle School
Smithfield Middle School
Watauga Middle School

Primary schools (Pre-K-5) 
Jack C. Binion Elementary
Birdville Elementary; National Blue Ribbon School
Foster Village Elementary
W.T. Francisco Elementary
Green Valley Elementary; 2005 National Blue Ribbon School
Grace E. Hardeman Elementary
Holiday Heights Elementary
Mullendore Elementary
North Ridge Elementary; 1998-99 National Blue Ribbon School
W.A. Porter Elementary
Richland Elementary
David E. Smith Elementary
Smithfield Elementary; 2017 National Blue Ribbon School
Snow Heights Elementary
Major Cheney Elementary at South Birdville
John D. Spicer Elementary
O.H. Stowe Elementary
Academy at C.F. Thomas
Walker Creek Elementary
Watauga Elementary
New Birdville Elementary

Alternative instructional
Birdville Center of Technology and Advanced Learning
Homebound
Shannon Learning Center DAEP (9-12)

See also

List of school districts in Texas
Diane Patrick, member of the Texas House of Representatives from Arlington and a former teacher in the Birdville district

References

External links 
 Birdville ISD

School districts in Tarrant County, Texas
North Richland Hills, Texas
1926 establishments in Texas
School districts established in 1926